Yuva Puraskar relates to books published by an author of the age of 35 and below as on 1 January of the year of the award. It is given each year to young writers for their outstanding works in the 24 languages, since 2011.

Recipients 
Following is the list of recipients of Yuva Puraskar for their works written in Meitei language (officially known as Manipuri language). The award comprises a cash prize of Rs. 50,000 and an engraved copper plaque.

Recipients

See also 

 List of Sahitya Akademi Award winners for Meitei
 List of Sahitya Akademi Translation Prize winners for Meitei

References

External links 
 Yuva Puraskar-Sahitya Akademi India - Official Website
 List of Yuva Puraskar Winners

Literary awards by language
Meitei-language literary awards
Meitei language-related lists
Manipur-related lists
Indian literary awards
Awards established in 2011
2011 establishments in India